The Kattasay and Daganasay Reservoirs Important Bird Area comprises two irrigation reservoirs and their surrounds in central Sughd Province in northwestern Tajikistan. Together, they have been identified as a  Important Bird Area (IBA) by BirdLife International.

Description
The IBA is situated on the northern slopes of the Turkestan Range. Both reservoirs are oligotrophic. The area has a semi-arid climate with warm summers and mild winters.

The IBA lies on the Central Asian Flyway and its characteristics of low disturbance, plenty of food and a mild climate attract birds. It is used by migrating waterfowl in autumn and spring, while various species of waterbirds, waders and birds of prey also overwinter there.

Daganasay Reservoir
Some 132 species of algae have been recorded.

Kattasay Reservoir
Kattasay lies in the Istravshanskaya depression. The main source of its water is the small Kattasay River.

Birds
Birds for which the site is important include saker falcons, solitary snipe, European rollers, Hume's larks, sulphur-bellied warblers, wallcreepers, brown accentors, water pipits, fire-fronted serins, crimson-winged finches, red-mantled rosefinches and white-winged grosbeaks.

References

Important Bird Areas of Tajikistan
Sughd Region